Russian School Hurghada is a private Russian international school in Hurghada, Egypt. It serves primary (years 1–4) and secondary (years 5–11) sections.

See also

 Egyptian Russian University

References

External links
 Russian School Hurghada 
  Russian School Hurghada 

Schools in Hurghada
Russian international schools
International schools in Egypt
Egypt–Russia relations